Native potato may refer to any of several taxa of tuberous flora:

In Africa:
Plectranthus rotundifolius

In Australia:
Platysace spp.
Marsdenia flavescens, Hairy milk vine, or native potato
Ipomoea costata, Australian native bush potato

United States:
Apios americana, potato-like food crop

Potato subspecies and varieties:
Andean potato, Solanum tuberosum andigena
Chilean potato, Solanum tuberosum tuberosum
See also: potato